Prathip Sukto is a Thai beach volleyball player. He is a member of the Thailand men's national beach volleyball team. He competed at the 2012 Asian Beach Games in Haiyang, China.

Club indoor 
  Cosmo Chiangrai VC (2015–2013, 2015–2016)

References

1990 births
Living people
Prathip Sukto
Prathip Sukto
Beach volleyball players at the 2014 Asian Games
Prathip Sukto
Prathip Sukto
Prathip Sukto